Yenişehir is a municipality and district governorate in Greater Mersin, Turkey. Mersin is one of the 30 metropolitan centers in Turkey with more than one municipality within city borders.  In Mersin there are four second-level municipalities in addition to Greater Mersin (büyükşehir) municipality.

History

Originally a part of Mersin municipality, the municipality of Yenişehir was established in 1993 as a secondary level municipality of Mersin. The corresponding district governorate was established in 2008.

Location
In the east Yenişehir is bounded by Efrenk River and in the south by Mediterranean Sea.

Population
According to 2020 figures, the population of Yenişehir was 268,776 (129,859 male and 138,917 female citizens),.
Approximately 25% of Mersin citizens live in Yenişehir.  The annual population growth is over 3.7% which is higher than Mersin average.

Living
Yenişehir, also regionally known as Pozcu, is the most densely populated intracity district of Mersin and serves as the City's commercial center. Mersin's largest shopping center "Forum" lies at the middle of Yenişehir. Both Mersin University and Toros University are located in Yenişehir. Muğdat Mosque, the largest mosque in Mersin is also in Yenişehir.

Rural area
There are eight villages and one town in the rural area of Yenişehir. The total population of the district is (urban and rural) 268,776

Sport
Most of Mersin sports venues are in Yenişehir. Tevfik Sırrı Gür Stadium as well as Mersin Olympic Stadium are in Yenişehir. Edip Buran Arena, Nevin Yanıt Athletics Complex, Macit Özcan Sports Complex, Mersin Olympic Swimming Pool, Mersin Volleyball Hall, Servet Tazegül Arena, Mersin Tennis Complex and Mersin Gymnastics Hall are also in Yenişehir. All of these facilities were used in 2013 Mediterranean Games.

For the 2013 Mediterranean Games, a 1,288-seat new Mersin Gymnastics Hall was built, and the existing multi-sport venue Edip Buran Arena as well as the Nevin Yanıt Athletics Complex were renovated and modernized. The Edip Buran Arena is home to Turkish Basketball League (TBL) player Mersin Büyükşehir Belediyesi men's and Turkish Women's Basketball League (TKBL) player Mersin Büyükşehir Belediyesi women's basketball teams. Tevfik Sırrı Gür Stadium is the home to Mersin İdmanyurdu. Another new sports venue built for the 2013 Mediterranean Games .is the Mersin Volleyball Hall with 1,000 seating capacity, which hosted the men's tournament matches. The Macit Özcan Sports Complex, built in 2008, consists of three football fields, three tennis courts and three swimming pools, one of them in Olympic-size. The water polo events took place at this site on June 19–26.

Sites of interest

 Muğdat Mosque, the City's largest Mosque and one of five Mosques in Turkey with six minarets.
 Mersin Archaeological Museum, opened in 2017 exhibits various items from different stages of Mersin Hisrory.
 Mersin Naval Museum, opened in 2010
 Mersin Marina

International relations

Yenişehir is twinned with:
 Neustadt an der Weinstraße, Germany
 Iskele, Northern Cyprus

See also
Mersin
Mersin Province
Akdeniz
Mezitli
Toroslar

References and notes

External links
 http://www.mersinyenisehir.gov.tr

 
Populated places in Mersin Province
Districts of Mersin Province